CVG may refer to: 

Cincinnati/Northern Kentucky International Airport's IATA abbreviation
Cutis verticis gyrata, a condition of the scalp
Computer and Video Games, a UK video game magazine and website
Convergys, a BPO company
Corporación Venezolana de Guayana, a Venezuelan conglomerate
 CVG, the ICAO airline designator for Carill Aviation, United Kingdom
Central Valley Greenway, a bicycle and pedestrian route in Metro Vancouver, Canada
Coriolis vibratory gyroscope, a gyroscope which uses a vibrating structure to determine the rate of rotation